Sir James Ian Cormack Crombie, KCB, KBE, CMG (1902–1969) was an English civil servant. Having served in the War Office, HM Treasury, the Ministry of Food and the Foreign Office, he concluded his career as Chairman of the Board of Customs and Excise from 1955 to 1962 and, simultaneously, Chairman of the Civil Service Sports Council from 1959 to 1962.

References 

1902 births
1969 deaths
English civil servants
Knights Companion of the Order of the Bath
Knights Commander of the Order of the British Empire
Companions of the Order of St Michael and St George